The origin of Shia–Sunni relations can be traced back to a dispute over the succession to the Islamic prophet Muhammad as a caliph of the Islamic community. After the death of Muhammad in 632, a group of Muslims, who would come to be known as the Sunnis, believed that Muhammad's successor should be Abu Bakr, whereas a second group of Muslims, who would come to be known as the Shias, believed that his successor should have been Ali. This dispute spread across various parts of the Muslim world, which eventually led to the Battle of Jamal and Battle of Siffin. Sectarianism based on this historic dispute intensified greatly after the Battle of Karbala, in which Husayn ibn Ali and some of his close partisans, including members of his household, were killed by the ruling Umayyad Caliph Yazid I, and the outcry for revenge divided the early Islamic community, albeit disproportionately, into two groups, the Sunni and the Shia. This is known today as the Islamic schism.

The present demographic breakdown between the two denominations is difficult to assess and varies by source, with most approximations stating that 90% of the world's Muslims are Sunni and 10% are Shia, with most Shias belonging to the Twelver tradition and the rest divided between many other groups. Sunnis are a majority in almost all Muslim communities around the world. Shia make up the majority of the citizen population in Iran, Iraq, Bahrain, and Azerbaijan, as well as being a minority in Pakistan, Lebanon, Saudi Arabia, Syria, Yemen, Nigeria, Afghanistan, Chad and Kuwait.

Today, there are differences in religious practice, traditions, and customs, often related to jurisprudence. Although all Muslim groups consider the Quran to be divine, Sunni and Shia have different opinions on hadith.

In recent years, Sunni–Shia relations have been increasingly marked by conflict, particularly the Iran–Saudi Arabia proxy conflict. Sectarian violence persists to this day from Pakistan to Yemen and is a major element of friction throughout the Middle East and South Asia. Tensions between communities have intensified during power struggles, such as the Bahraini uprising, the Iraqi Civil War, the Syrian Civil War, the War in Iraq (2013–2017), and the formation of the self-styled Islamic State of Iraq and Syria that has launched a genocide against Shias.

Numbers
Sunni Muslims are the vast majority of Muslims in most Muslim communities in Central Asia (including China), Europe (including Russia and the Balkans), South Asia, Southeast Asia, Africa, Arab World, Turkey and among Muslims in the United States where in Shias are approximately 10%.

Shias make up the majority of the Muslim population in Iran (around 90%), Azerbaijan (around 65%), Iraq (around 55%) and Bahrain (around 60% of the citizens, excluding expatriates). Shia communities are also found in Yemen where a large minority of the population are Shia (mostly of the Zaidi sect), according to the UNHCR. Sources put the numbers of Shias in Yemen at 25-30%. About 10% of Turkey's population belong to the Alevi sect. The Shia constitute around 20% of Kuwait, 45% of the Muslim population in Lebanon, 10% of Saudi Arabia, 12% of Syria, and 10% of Pakistan. Around 10% of Afghanistan, less than 5% of the Muslims in Nigeria, and around 5% of population of Tajikistan are Shia.

Historical beliefs and leadership

Successors of Muhammad

Mahdi

The Mahdi is the prophesied redeemer of Islam. While Shias and Sunnis differ on the nature of the Mahdi, many members of both groups believe that the Mahdi will appear at the end of the world to bring about a perfect and just Islamic society.

In Shia Islam, "the Mahdi symbol has developed into a powerful and central religious idea." Twelvers believe the Mahdi will be Muhammad al-Mahdi, the twelfth Imam returned from the Occultation, where he has been hidden by Allah since 874. In contrast, mainstream Sunnis believe the Mahdi will be named Muhammad, be a descendant of Muhammad, and will revive the faith, and forms an important component of Sunni eschatology, his appearance being considered the last of the minor signs of the Day of Judgment before its major signs.

Hadith
The Shias accept some of the same hadiths used by Sunnis as part of the sunnah to argue their case. In addition, they consider the sayings of Ahl al-Bayt that are not attributed directly to Muhammad as hadiths. Shias do not accept many Sunni hadiths unless they are also recorded in Shia sources or the methodology can be proven of how they were recorded. Also, some Sunni-accepted hadiths are less favored by Shias; one example is that because of Aisha's opposition to Ali, hadiths narrated by Aisha are not given the same authority as those by other companions. Another example is hadith narrated by Abu Hurairah, who is considered by Shias as an enemy of Ali. The Shia argument is that Abu Hurairah was only a Muslim for four years of his life before Muhammad's death. Although he accompanied Muhammad for only four years, he managed to record ten times as many hadiths as Abu Bakr and Ali each.

Shiism and Sufism
Shiism and Sufism are said to share a number of hallmarks: Belief in an inner meaning to the Quran, special status for some mortals (saints for Sufi, Imams for Shias), as well as veneration of Ali and Muhammad's family.

Pillars of faith
The Five Pillars of Islam (Arabic: أركان الإسلام) is the term given to the five duties incumbent on every Muslim. These duties are Shahada (profession of faith), salat (prayers), Zakāt (giving of alms), Sawm (fasting, specifically during Ramadan) and Hajj (pilgrimage to Mecca). These five practices are essential to Sunni and Shia Muslims. Shia theology has two concepts that define religion as a whole. There are Roots of Religion (Usūl al-Dīn) and Branches of Religion (Furu al Din).

Practices
Many distinctions can be made between Sunnis and Shiaīs through observation alone:

Salat

When prostrating during ritual prayer called Salah in Arabic. Shias place their forehead onto a piece of naturally occurring material, most often a clay tablet (mohr), soil (turbah) at times from Karbala, the place where Hussein ibn Ali was martyred, instead of directly onto prayer rug.

Some Shia perform prayers more than once in quick succession (1+2+2 i.e. fajr on its own Dhuhr with Asr and Maghrib with Isha'), thus praying five times a day but with a very small break in between the prayer, instead of five prayers with some gap between them as required by Sunni schools of law.

Shias and the followers of the Sunni Maliki school hold their hands at their sides during prayer; Sunnis of other schools cross their arms (right over left) and clasp their hands; it is commonly held by Sunni scholars especially of Maliki school that either is acceptable.

Mut'ah and Misyar

Twelver Shia as the main branch of Shia Islam permit Nikah mut‘ah—fixed-term temporary marriage—which is not acceptable within the Sunni community, the Ismaili Shia or the Zaidi Shia and is believed a planned and agreed fornication. Twelvers believe that Mutah was permitted until Umar forbade it during his rule. Mutah is not the same as Misyar marriage or  'Arfi marriage, which has no date of expiration and is permitted by some Sunnis. A Misyar marriage differs from a conventional Islamic marriage in that the man does not have financial responsibility of the woman by her own free will. The man can divorce the woman whenever he wants to in a Misyar marriage.

Hijab and dress

Both Sunni and Shia women wear the hijab. Devout women of the Shia traditionally wear black and yellow as do some Sunni women in the Persian Gulf. Some Shia religious leaders also wear a black robe. Mainstream Shia and Sunni women wear the hijab differently. Some Sunni scholars emphasize covering of all body including the face in public whereas some scholars exclude the face from hijab. Shias believe that the hijab must cover around the perimeter of the face and up to the chin. Like Sunnis, some Shia women, such as those in Iran and Iraq, use their hand to hold the black chador, in order to cover their faces when in public.

Given names
Shia are sometimes recognizable by their names, which are often derived from the names of Ahl al-Bayt. In particular, the names Fatima, Zaynab, Ali, Abbas, Hussein, and Hassan are disproportionately common among Shias, though they may also be used by Sunnis. Umar, Uthman, Abu Bakr, Aisha, Muawiya, being the names of figures recognized by Sunnis but not Shias, are commonly used as names for Sunnis but are very rare, if not virtually absent, for Shias.

Early history
The origin of Shia Islam initially arose in response to the succession to Muhammad, and whether Ali ibn Abi Talib or a more experienced member of the Quraysh tribe should succeed. The concept of Shi'ism further crystallized around events at the Battle of Karbala, where Husayn ibn Ali, the son of Ali and grandson of the prophet, was killed alongside many of his supporters. Thus a political split became a far more personal one, marked by blood feud, and a cause for further divergence.

Even so, by the thirteenth to fourtheenth century, Sunni and Shiite practices remained highly intertwined and figures today commonly associated with Shia Islam, such as Ali and Jafar al-Sadiq, played an almost universal role for Muslim believers to understand the unseen (Al-Ghaib).

Abbasid era

The Umayyads were overthrown in 750 by a new dynasty, the Abbasids. The first Abbasid caliph, As-Saffah, recruited Shia support in his campaign against the Umayyads by emphasising his blood relationship to Muhammad's household through descent from his uncle, ‘Abbas ibn ‘Abd al-Muttalib. The Shia also believe that he promised them that the Caliphate, or at least religious authority, would be vested in the Shia Imam. As-Saffah assumed both the temporal and religious mantle of Caliph himself. He continued the Umayyad dynastic practice of succession, and his brother al-Mansur succeeded him in 754.

Ja'far al-Sadiq, the sixth Shia Imam, died during al-Mansur's reign, and there were claims that he was murdered on the orders of the caliph. (However, Abbasid persecution of Islamic scholars was not restricted to the Shia. Abū Ḥanīfa, for example, was imprisoned by al-Mansur and tortured.)

Shia sources further claim that by the orders of the tenth Abbasid caliph, al-Mutawakkil, the tomb of the third Imam, Hussein ibn Ali in Karbala, was completely demolished, and Shias were sometimes beheaded in groups, buried alive, or even placed alive within the walls of government buildings still under construction.

The Shia believe that their community continued to live for the most part in hiding and followed their religious life secretly without external manifestations.

Iraq

Many Shia Iranians migrated to what is now Iraq in the 16th century. "It is said that when modern Iraq was formed, some of the population of Karbala was Iranian". In time, these immigrants adopted the Arabic language and Arab identity, but their origin has been used to "unfairly cast them as lackeys of Iran".  However many of these Shias come from Sayyid families with origins in tribes from Iraq, Lebanon and Bahrain, one of said tribes being al-Musawi, and two prevalent families that are descended from it and lived in Iran for some time before settling in Iraq are the al-Qazwini and al-Shahristani families. Other Iraqi Shias are ethnic Arabs with roots in Iraq as deep as those of their Sunni counterparts.

Persia

Shafi'i Sunnism was the dominant form of Islam in most of Iran until rise of the Safavid Empire although a significant undercurrent of Ismailism and a very large minority of Twelvers were present all over Persia.

The Sunni hegemony did not undercut the Shia presence in Iran. The writers of the Shia Four Books were Iranian, as were many other scholars. According to Morteza Motahhari:

Pre-Safavid
The domination of the Sunni creed during the first nine Islamic centuries characterizes the religious history of Iran during this period. There were some exceptions to this general domination which emerged in the form of the Zaidis of Tabaristan, the Buwayhid, the rule of the Sultan Muhammad Khudabandah (r. 1304–1316) and the Sarbedaran. Nevertheless, apart from this domination there existed, firstly, throughout these nine centuries, Shia inclinations among many Sunnis of this land and, secondly, Twelver and Zaidi Shiism had prevalence in some parts of Iran. During this period, the Shia in Iran were nourished from Kufa, Baghdad and later from Najaf and Al Hillah. Shia were dominant in Tabaristan, Qom, Kashan, Avaj and Sabzevar. In many other areas the population of Shias and Sunni was mixed.

The first Zaidi state was established in Daylaman and Tabaristan (northern Iran) in 864 by the Alavids; it lasted until the death of its leader at the hand of the Samanids in 928. Roughly forty years later the state was revived in Gilan (north-western Iran) and survived under Hasanid leaders until 1126. After which from the 12th-13th centuries, the Zaidis of Daylaman, Gilan and Tabaristan then acknowledge the Zaidi Imams of Yemen or rival Zaidi Imams within Iran.

The Buyids, who were Zaidi and had a significant influence not only in the provinces of Persia but also in the capital of the caliphate in Baghdad, and even upon the caliph himself, provided a unique opportunity for the spread and diffusion of Shia thought. This spread of Shiism to the inner circles of the government enabled the Shia to withstand those who opposed them by relying upon the power of the caliphate.

Twelvers came to Iran from Arab regions in the course of four stages. First, through the Asharis at the end of the 7th and during the 8th century. Second through the pupils of Sabzevar, and especially those of Al-Shaykh Al-Mufid, who were from Rey and Sabzawar and resided in those cities. Third, through the school of Hillah under the leadership of Al-Hilli and his son Fakhr al-Muhaqqiqin. Fourth, through the scholars of Jabal Amel residing in that region, or in Iraq, during the 16th and 17th centuries who later migrated to Iran.

On the other hand, the Ismaili da‘wah ("missionary institution") sent missionaries (du‘āt, sg. dā‘ī) during the Fatimid Caliphate to Persia. When the Ismailis divided into two sects, Nizaris established their base in northern Persia. Hassan-i Sabbah conquered fortresses and captured Alamut in 1090. Nizaris used this fortress until the Mongols finally seized and destroyed it in 1256.

After the Mongols and the fall of the Abbasids, the Sunni Ulama suffered greatly. In addition to the destruction of the caliphate there was no official Sunni school of law. Many libraries and madrasahs were destroyed and Sunni scholars migrated to other Islamic areas such as Anatolia and Egypt. In contrast, most Shia were largely unaffected as their center was not in Iran at this time. For the first time, the Shia could openly convert other Muslims to their movement.

Several local Shia dynasties like the Marashi and Sarbadars were established during this time. The kings of the Kara Koyunlu dynasty ruled in Tabriz with a domain extending to Fars and Kerman. In Egypt the Fatimid government ruled.

Muhammad Khudabandah, the famous builder of Soltaniyeh, was among the first of the Mongols to convert to Shiaism, and his descendants ruled for many years in Persia and were instrumental in spreading Shī‘ī thought. Sufism played a major role in spread of Shiism in this time.

Post-Safavid
Ismail I initiated a religious policy to recognize Shiism as the official religion of the Safavid Empire, and the fact that modern Iran and Azerbaijan remain majority-Shia states is a direct result of Ismail's actions.

Unfortunately for Ismail, most of his subjects were Sunni. He thus had to enforce official Shiism violently, putting to death those who opposed him. Under this pressure, Safavid subjects either converted or pretended to convert, but it is safe to say that the majority of the population was probably genuinely Shia by the end of the Safavid period in the 18th century, and most Iranians today are Shia, although there is still a Sunni minority.
This led to a wide gap between Iran and its Sunni neighbors, particularly its rival, the Ottoman Empire, in the wake of the Battle of Chaldiran. This gap continued until the 20th century.

Levant

The Shia faith in the Levant started spreading during the Hamdanid rule, which commenced in the start of the 10th century. It was followed by the Mirdasid Shi'ite emirate in the 11th century, with both the emirates centered at Aleppo.

The general observations recorded by Muslim travellers passing through the Levant during the tenth and eleventh centuries, notably al-Maqdisi in his geographical works, “The best divisions in the knowledge of the regions”, as well as Ibn Jubayr, indicate that Shia Muslims made up the majority of the populations of the regions of the Levant during this era, notably in the cities of Damascus, Tiberias, Nablus, Tyre, Homs and Jabal Amel. In addition to the account of Nasir Khusraw who visited Jerusalem in the year 1045 AD and reported: "The population of Jerusalem is about 20,000, the populace being mostly Shi'a Muslims". However, with the advent of the Zengids and Ayyubids, the population of Shias dwindled greatly due to conversion and migrations.

In 1305, the Sunni Mamelukes carried out a grand campaign to erase the Shiite dominance in the coastal mountains of Lebanon. This campaign forced most of the Shiites to disperse, with some fleeing south to Jabal Amel and some to the Bekaa, while a very small portion of them took on the practice of Taqiyya until the Ottomans came in 1517. Many Shias in the Levant were killed for their faith. One of these was Muhammad Ibn Makki, called Shahid-i Awwal (the First Martyr), one of the great figures in Shia jurisprudence, who was killed in Damascus in 1384.

Shahab al-Din Suhrawardi was another eminent scholar, killed in Aleppo on charges of cultivating Batini teachings and philosophy.

On 21 April 1802, about 12,000 Wahhabi Sunnis under the command of Abdul-Aziz bin Muhammad, the second ruler of the First Saudi State attacked and sacked Karbala, killed between 2,000 and 5,000 inhabitants and plundered the tomb of Husayn ibn Ali, grandson of Prophet Muhammad and son of Ali ibn Abi Talib, and destroyed its dome, seizing a large quantity of spoils, including gold, Persian carpets, money, pearls, and guns that had accumulated in the tomb, most of them donations. The attack lasted for eight hours, after which the Wahhabis left the city with more than 4,000 camels carrying their plunder.

Caucasus region

The Sack of Shamakhi took place on 18 August 1721, when 15,000 Sunni Lezgins, of the Safavid Empire, attacked the capital of Shirvan province, Shamakhi (in present-day Azerbaijan Republic), massacred between 4,000 and 5,000 of its Shia population and ransacked the city.

India

Sunni razzias which came to be known as Taarajs virtually devastated the community. History records 10 such Taarajs also known as Taraj-e-Shia between the 15th and 19th centuries in 1548, 1585, 1635, 1686, 1719, 1741, 1762, 1801, 1830, 1872 during which the Shia habitations were plundered, people slaughtered, libraries burnt and their sacred sites desecrated.

Mughal Empire
Shia in India faced persecution by some Sunni rulers and Mughal Emperors which resulted in the killings of Shia scholars like Qazi Nurullah Shustari (also known as Shaheed-e-Thaalis, the third Martyr) and Mirza Muhammad Kamil Dehlavi (also known as Shaheed-e- Rabay, the fourth Martyr) who are two of the five martyrs of Shia Islam. Shias in Kashmir in subsequent years had to pass through the most atrocious period of their history.

20th century
Sunni–Shia clashes also occurred occasionally in the 20th century in India. There were many between 1904 and 1908. These clashes revolved around the public cursing of the first three caliphs by Shias and the praising of them by Sunnis. To put a stop to the violence, public demonstrations were banned in 1909 on the three most sensitive days: Ashura, Chehlum and Ali's death on 21 Ramadan. Intercommunal violence resurfaced in 1935–36 and again in 1939 when many thousands of Sunni and Shias defied the ban on public demonstrations and took to the streets. Shias are estimated to be 10-15% of the Muslim population in India and Pakistan and less than 1% of Muslim population in Bangladesh, although the total number is difficult to estimate due to the intermingling between the two groups and practice of taqiyya by Shia.

Modern history

In addition to Iran, Iraq has emerged as a major Shia government when the Twelvers achieved political dominance in 2005 under American occupation. The two communities have often remained separate, mingling regularly only during the Hajj pilgrimage in Mecca. In some countries like Iraq, Syria, Kuwait and Bahrain, communities have mingled and intermarried. Some Shia have complained of mistreatment in countries dominated by Sunnis, especially in Saudi Arabia, while some Sunnis have complained of discrimination in the Twelver-dominated states of Iraq and Iran.

Some tension developed between Sunnis and Shia as a result of clashes over Iranian pilgrims and Saudi police at the hajj. Millions of Saudi adhere to the school of Salafism which is a branch of Sunni Islam.

According to some reports, as of mid-2013, the Syrian Civil War has become "overtly sectarian" with the "sectarian lines fall most sharply" between Alawites and Sunnis. With the involvement of Lebanese Shia paramilitary group Hezbollah, the fighting in Syria has reignited "long-simmering tensions between Sunnis and Shi’ites" spilling over into Lebanon and Iraq. Bulgaria's ex-Ambassador Dimitar Mihaylov further claims that the current post-Arab Spring situation (encompassing ISIS, the Syrian civil war, Yemen, Iraq and others) represents a "qualitatively new" development in the history of Shi'a-Sunni dynamics. Historically, the inner rifts within Islamic ideology were to be hidden from the public sphere, while the new violent outbreaks highlight said rift in an obvious manner and is nourished by the two extremes of their mutual rivalry which will strongly affect both globally and regionally.

1919–1970
At least one scholar sees the period from the collapse of the Ottoman Empire through the decline of Arab nationalism as a time of relative unity and harmony between traditionalist Sunni and Shia Muslims—unity brought on by a feeling of being under siege from a common threat, secularism, first of the European colonial variety and then Arab nationalist.

An example of Sunni–Shia cooperation was the Khilafat Movement which swept South Asia following the defeat of the Ottoman Empire, the seat of the Caliphate, in World War I. Shia scholars "came to the caliphate's defence" by attending the 1931 Caliphate Conference in Jerusalem, although they were theologically opposed to the idea that non-imams could be caliphs or successors to Muhammad, and that the caliphate was "the flagship institution" of Sunni, not Shia, authority. This has been described as unity of traditionalists in the face of the twin threats of "secularism and colonialism."

In these years Allama Muhammad Taqi Qummi travelled to Cairo and started his efforts for reforming Islamic unity at Al-Azhar University, since 1938. Finally, his efforts and contacting with scholars such as Mahmud Shaltut and Seyyed Hossein Borujerdi led to the founding of Dar-al-Taghrib (community for reforming unity between Sunni and Shia Muslims).

Another example of unity was a fatwā issued by the rector of Al-Azhar University, Mahmud Shaltut, recognizing Shia Islamic law as the fifth school of Islamic law. In 1959, al-Azhar University in Cairo, the most influential center of Sunni learning, authorized the teaching of courses of Shia jurisprudence as part of its curriculum.

The year of the Iranian Islamic Revolution was "one of great ecumenical discourse", and shared enthusiasm by both Shia and Sunni Islamists.
After the Iranian Revolution and the fall of Pahlavi dynasty, Ayatollah Ruhollah Khomeini endeavored to bridge the gap between Shiites and Sunnis by declaring it permissible for Twelvers to pray behind Sunni imams and by forbidding criticizing the Caliphs who preceded Ali—an issue that had caused much animosity between the two groups. In addition, he designated the period of Prophet's Birthday celebrations from 12th to the 17th of Rabi Al-Awwal as the Islamic Unity Week, there being a gap in the dates of when Shiites and Sunnis celebrate Muhammad's birthday.

Post-1980

Following this period, Sunni–Shia strife has seen a major upturn, particularly in Iraq and Pakistan, leading to thousands of deaths. Among the explanations for the increase are conspiracies by outside forces to divide Muslims, the recent Islamic revival and increased religious purity and consequent takfir, upheaval, destruction and loss of power of Sunni caused by the US invasion of Iraq, and sectarianism generated by Arab regimes defending themselves against the mass uprisings of the Arab Spring.

Outside conspiracies
Many in the Muslim world explain the bloodshed as the work of conspiracies by outside forces—"the forces of hegemony and Zionism which aim to weaken [Arabs]" (Akbar Hashemi Rafsanjani and Yusuf al-Qaradawi), unspecified "enemies" (Iran president Mahmoud Ahmadinejad), or "oppressive pressure by the imperialist front." (Mahmoud Ahmadinejad).

Some Western analysts assert that the US is practicing divide and rule strategy through the escalation of Sunni-Shia conflict. Nafeez Ahmed cites a 2008 RAND Corporation study for the American military which recommended "divide and rule" as a possible strategy against the Muslim world in "the Long War."  Dr. Christopher Davidson argues that the current crisis in Yemen is being “egged on” by the US, and could be part of a wider covert strategy to “spur fragmentation in Iran allies and allow Israel to be surrounded by weak states”.

Islamic revival
Others lay the blame for the strife at a very different source, the unintended effects of the Islamic revival. According to scholar Vali Nasr, as the Muslim world was decolonialised and Arab nationalism lost its appeal, fundamentalism blossomed and reasserted the differences and conflicts between the two movements, particularly in the strict teachings of Sunni scholar Ibn Taymiyyah. The Iranian Islamic revolution changed the Shia–Sunni power equation in Muslim countries "from Lebanon to India" arousing the traditionally subservient Shia to the alarm of traditionally dominant and very non-revolutionary Sunni. "Where Iranian revolutionaries saw Islamic revolutionary stirrings, Sunnis saw mostly Shia mischief and a threat to Sunni predominance."

Although the Iranian revolution's leader, Ayatollah Khomeini, was very much in favor of Shia–Sunni unity, he also challenged Saudi Arabia, in his view an "unpopular and corrupt dictatorship" and an "American lackey" ripe for revolution. In part because Saudi Arabia was the world's major international funder of Islamic schools, scholarships, and fellowships, this angered not only Saudi Arabia but its many fundamentalist allies and benefactors throughout the Arab world, according to Nasr.

Another effect noted by political scientist Gilles Kepel, is that the initial attraction of the Islamic Revolution to Sunnis as well as Shia, and Khomeini's desire to export his revolution, motivated the Saudi establishment to shore up its "religious legitimacy" with more strictness in religion (and with jihad in Afghanistan) to compete with Iran's revolutionary ideology. But doing so in Saudi meant a more anti-Shia policies because Saudi's own native Sunni school of Islam is Wahhabism, which includes the prohibition of Shia Islam itself, as strict Wahhabis do not consider Shia to be Islamic. This new strictness was spread not only among Saudis in the kingdom but thousands of students and Saudi funded schools and international Islamist volunteers who came to training camps in Peshawar Pakistan in the 1980s to learn to fight jihad in Afghanistan and went home in the 1990s to fight jihad. Both groups (especially in Iraq and Pakistan) saw Shia as the enemy. Thus, although the Iranian revolution's leader, Ayatollah Khomeini, was very much in favor of Shia–Sunni unity, and "the leadership position that went with it", his revolution worked against it.

From the Iranian Revolution to 2015, Shia groups in Lebanon, Iraq, Syria, Yemen, supported by Iran have recently won "important political victories" which have boosted Iran's regional influence.
In Lebanon, Hezbollah, the Lebanese Shia militia and political movement is the "strongest political actor" in the country. Since the 2003 invasion of Iraq removed Saddam Hussein from power and instituted elected government, the Shia majority has dominated the parliament and its prime ministers have been Shia. In Syria, a Shia minority—the heterodox Alawi sect that makes up only about 13 percent of the population—dominate the upper reaches of the government, military and security services in Syria, and are the "backbone" of the forces fighting to protect the Bashar al-Assad regime in Syria's civil war. In Yemen, Houthi rebels have expanded their territory south of Saudi Arabia, and become the country's "dominant power".

Olivier Roy, research director at the French National Centre for Scientific Research, sees the "Shia awakening and its instrumentalisation by Iran" as leading to a "very violent Sunni reaction", starting first in Pakistan before spreading to "the rest of the Muslim world, without necessarily being as violent." According to Roy, "two events created a sea change in the balance of power between Shia and Sunnis: the Islamic revolution in Iran and the American military intervention in Iraq" in 2003. "Today, Azerbaijan is probably the only country where there are still mixed mosques and Shia and Sunnis pray together."

From 1994 to 2014 satellite television and high-speed Internet has spread "hate speech" against both Sunni and Shia. Fundamentalist Sunni clerics have popularized slurs against Shia such as "Safawis" (from the Safavid empire, thus implying their being an Iranian agents), or even worse rafidha (rejecters of the faith), and majus (Zoroastrian or crypto Persian). In turn, Shia religious scholars have "mocked and cursed" the first three caliphs and Aisha, Mohammed's youngest wife who fought against Ali.

US invasion of Iraq

Among those blaming the US invasion of Iraq are Fawaz Gerges, who writes in his book ISIS: A History,

By destroying state institutions and establishing a sectarian-based political system, the 2003 US-led invasion polarized the country along Sunni-Shia lines and set the stage for a fierce, prolonged struggle driven by identity politics. Anger against the United States was also fueled by the humiliating disbandment of the Iraqi army and the de-Baathification law, which was first introduced as a provision and then turned into a permanent article of the constitution.

Malise Ruthven writes that the post invasion de-Ba'athification by the US occupiers deprived Iraq of "the officer class and administrative cadres that had ruled under Saddam Hussein, leaving the field to sectarian-based militias". Many of officers joined the anti-Shia takfiri ISIL group.

The US-led invasion also “tilted the regional balance of power decisively" in favor of Shia Iran, alarming Sunni and leading to talk of a “Shia Crescent”.

Counter-revolutionary tactic

Marc Lynch in his book The New Arab Wars: Uprisings and Anarchy in the Middle East, argues that as old regimes or political forces sought to control "the revolutionary upsurge" of the Arab Spring, sectarianism became “a key weapon” to undermine unity among the anti-regime masses. Christians were pitted "against Muslims in Egypt, Jordanians against Palestinians in Jordan, and, above all, Sunnis against Shi’ites wherever possible.”

Iraq 

Shia–Sunni discord in Iraq starts with disagreement over the relative population of the two groups. According to most sources, including the CIA's World Factbook, the majority of Iraqis are Shia Arab Muslims (60%), and Sunni muslims represent between 37% of the population. However, Sunni are split ethnically among Arabs, Kurds and Turkmen. Many Sunnis hotly dispute their minority status, including ex-Iraqi Ambassador Faruq Ziada, and many believe Shia majority is "a myth spread by America". One Sunni belief shared by Jordan's King Abdullah as well as his then Defense Minister Shaalan is that Shia numbers in Iraq were inflated by Iranian Shias crossing the border. Shia scholar Vali Nasr believes the election turnout in summer and December 2005 confirmed a strong Shia majority in Iraq.

The British, having put down a Shia rebellion against their rule in the 1920s, "confirmed their reliance on a corps of Sunni ex-officers of the collapsed Ottoman empire". The British colonial rule ended after the Sunni and Shia united against it.

The Shia suffered indirect and direct persecution under post-colonial Iraqi governments since 1932, erupting into full-scale rebellions in 1935 and 1936. Shias were also persecuted during the Ba'ath Party rule, especially under Saddam Hussein. It is said that every Shia clerical family of note in Iraq had tales of torture and murder to recount. In 1969 the son of Iraq's highest Shia Ayatollah Muhsin al-Hakim was arrested and allegedly tortured. From 1979 to 1983 Saddam's regime executed 48 major Shia clerics in Iraq. They included Shia leader Mohammad Baqir al-Sadr and his sister. Tens of thousands of Iranians and Arabs of Iranian origin were expelled in 1979 and 1980 and a further 75,000 in 1989.

The Shias openly revolted against Saddam following the Gulf War in 1991 and were encouraged by Saddam's defeat in Kuwait and by simultaneous Kurdish uprising in the north. However, Shia opposition to the government was brutally suppressed, resulting in some 50,000 to 100,000 casualties and successive repression by Saddam's forces. The governing regimes of Iraq were composed mainly of Sunnis for nearly a century until the 2003 Iraq War.

 Iraq War
Some of the worst sectarian strife ever has occurred after the start of the Iraq War, steadily building up to the present. The war has featured a cycle of Sunni–Shia revenge killing—Sunni often used car bombs, while Shia favored death squads.

According to one estimate, as of early 2008, 1,121 suicide bombers have blown themselves up in Iraq. Sunni suicide bombers have targeted not only thousands of civilians, but mosques, shrines, wedding and funeral processions, markets, hospitals, offices, and streets. Sunni insurgent organizations include Ansar al-Islam. Radical groups include Al-Tawhid Wal-Jihad, Jeish Muhammad, and Black Banner Organization.

Takfir motivation for many of these killings may come from Sunni insurgent leader Abu Musab al-Zarqawi. Before his death Zarqawi was one to quote Muhammad ibn Abd al-Wahhab, especially his infamous statement urging followers to kill the Shia of Iraq, and calling the Shias "snakes". An al-Qaeda-affiliated website posted a call for "a full-scale war on Shiites all over Iraq, whenever and wherever they are found." Suicide bombers continue to attack Iraqi Shia civilians, and the Shia ulama have in response declared suicide bombing as haraam (against God, or "forbidden"):

Some believe the war has strengthened the takfir thinking and may spread Sunni–Shia strife elsewhere.

On the Shia side, in early February 2006 militia-dominated government death squads were reportedly "tortur[ing] to death or summarily" executing "hundreds" of Sunnis "every month in Baghdad alone," many arrested at random. According to the British television Channel 4, from 2005 through early 2006, commandos of the Ministry of the Interior which is controlled by the Badr Organization, and

The violence shows little sign of getting opposite sides to back down. Iran's Shia leaders are said to become "more determined" the more violent the anti-Shia attacks in Iraq become. One Shia Grand Ayatollah, Yousef Saanei, who has been described as a moderate, reacted to the 2005 suicide bombings of Shia targets in Iraq by saying the bombers were "wolves without pity" and that "sooner rather than later, Iran will have to put them down".

Iran 

Iran is unique in the Muslim world because its population is overwhelmingly more Shia than Sunni (Shia constitute 95% of the population) and because its constitution is theocratic republic based on rule by a Shia jurist.

Although the founder of the Islamic Republic, Ayatollah Ruhollah Khomeini, supported good Sunni–Shia relations, there have been complaints by Sunni of discrimination, particularly in important government positions. In a joint appearance with former Iranian president Akbar Hashemi Rafsanjani calling for Shia-Sunni unity, Sunni Shiekh Yusuf al-Qaradawi complained that no ministers in Iran have been Sunni for a long time, that Sunni officials are scarce even in the regions with majority of Sunni population (such as Kurdistan, or Balochistan) and despite the presence of Christian churches, as a prominent example of this discrimination. Although reformist President Mohammad Khatami promised during his election campaign to build a Sunni mosque in Tehran, none was built during his eight years in office. The president explained the situation by saying Supreme Leader Ayatollah Ali Khamenei would not agree to the proposal. As in other parts of the Muslim world, other issues may play a part in the conflict, since most Sunnis in Iran are also ethnic minorities.

Soon after the 1979 revolution, Sunni leaders from Kurdistan, Balouchistan, and Khorassan, set up a new party known as Shams, which is short for Shora-ye Markaz-e al Sunaat, to unite Sunnis and lobby for their rights. But six months after that they were closed down, bank accounts suspended and had their leaders arrested by the government on charges that they were backed by Saudi Arabia and Pakistan.

A UN human rights report states that:

Members of the 'Balochistan Peoples Front' claim that Sunnis are systematically discriminated against educationally by denial of places at universities, politically by not allowing Sunnis to be army generals, ambassadors, ministers, prime minister, or president, religiously insulting Sunnis in the media, economic discrimination by not giving import or export licenses for Sunni businesses while the majority of Sunnis are left unemployed.

There has been a low level resistance in mainly Sunni Iranian Balouchistan against the regime for several years. Official media refers to the fighting as armed clashes between the police and "bandits," "drug-smugglers," and "thugs," to disguise what many believe is essentially a political-religious conflict. Revolutionary Guards have stationed several brigades in Balouchi cities, and have allegedly tracked down and assassinated Sunni leaders both inside Iran and in neighboring Pakistan. In 1996 a leading Sunni, Abdulmalek Mollahzadeh, was gunned down by hitmen, allegedly hired by Tehran, as he was leaving his house in Karachi.

Members of Sunni groups in Iran however have been active in what the authorities describe as terrorist activities. Balochi Sunni Abdolmalek Rigi continue to declare the Shia as Kafir and Mushrik. These Sunni groups have been involved in violent activities in Iran and have waged terrorist attacks against civilian centers, including an attack next to a girls' school according to government sources. The "shadowy Sunni militant group Jundallah" has reportedly been receiving weaponry from the United States for these attacks according to the semi-official Fars News Agency. The United Nations and several countries worldwide have condemned the bombings. (See 2007 Zahedan bombings for more information)

Non-Sunni Iranian opposition parties, and Shia like Ayatollah Jalal Gange’i have criticised the regime's treatment of Sunnis and confirmed many Sunni complaints.

Following the 2005 elections, much of the leadership of Iran has been described as more "staunchly committed to core Shia values" and lacking Ayatollah Khomeini's commitment to Shia–Sunni unity. Polemics critical of Sunnis were reportedly being produced in Arabic for dissemination in the Arab Muslim world by Hojjatieh-aligned elements in the Iranian regime. Sunni mosques are not allowed in the capital city of Tehran, and a number of Sunni mosques in other cities have been demolished, Sunni literature and teachings are banned in public schools and construction of new Sunni mosques and schools are banned.

Syria 

Syria is approximately three quarters Sunni, but its government is predominantly Alawite, a Shia sect that makes up less than 13% of the population. Under Hafez al-Assad, Alawites dominated the Arab Socialist Ba'ath Party, a secular Arab nationalist party which had ruled Syria under a state of emergency from 1963 to 2011. Alawites are often considered a form of Shia Islam, that differs somewhat from the larger Twelver Shia sect.

During the 20th century, an Islamic uprising in Syria occurred with sectarian religious overtones between the Alawite-dominated Assad government and the Islamist Sunni Muslim Brotherhood, culminating with the 1982 Hama massacre. An estimated 10,000 to 40,000 Syrians, mostly civilians, were killed by Syrian military in the city. During the uprising, the Sunni Muslim Brotherhood attacked military cadets at an artillery school in Aleppo, performed car bomb attacks in Damascus, as well as bomb attacks against the government and its officials, including Hafez al-Assad himself, and had killed several hundred.

How much of the conflict was sparked by Sunni versus Shia divisions and how much by Islamism versus secular-Arab-nationalism, is in question, but according to scholar Vali Nasr the failure of the Ayatollah Khomeini and the Islamic Republic of Iran to support the Muslim Brotherhood against the Baathists "earned [Khomeini] the Brotherhood's lasting contempt." It proved to the satisfaction of the Brotherhood that sectarian loyalty trumped Islamist solidarity for Khomeini and eliminated whatever appeal Khomeini might have had to the MB movement as a pan-Islamic leader.

 Syria Civil War

The Syrian Civil War, though it started as a political conflict, developed into a struggle between the Alawite-dominated Army and government on the one hand, and the mainly Sunni rebels and former members of the regular army on the other. The casualty toll of the war's first three years has exceeded that of Iraq's decade-long conflict, and the fight has "amplified sectarian tensions to unprecedented levels". Rebel groups with 10,000s of Sunni Syrian fighters such as Ahrar ash-Sham, the Islamic Front, and al-Qaeda's al-Nusra Front, employ anti-Shia rhetoric and foreign Arab and Western Sunni fighters have joined the rebels. On the other side Shia from Hezbollah in Lebanon and from Asaib Ahl al-Haq and Kata'ib Hezbollah militias from Iraq have backed the Syrian government. "Even Afghan Shia refugees in Iran", driven from Afghanistan by Sunni extremism, have "reportedly been recruited by Tehran for the war in Syria".

Saudi Arabia 

While Shia make up roughly 10% of Saudi Arabia's population, they form a large portion of the residents of the eastern province of Hasa—by some estimates a majority—where much of the petroleum industry is based. Between 500,000 and a million Shia live there, concentrated especially around the oases of Qatif and al-Hasa. The Majority of Saudi Shia belong to the sect of the Twelvers.

The Saudi conflict of Shia and Sunni extends beyond the borders of the kingdom because of international Saudi "Petro-Islam" influence. Saudi Arabia backed Iraq in the 1980–1988 war with Iran and sponsored militants in Pakistan and Afghanistan who—though primarily targeting the Soviet Union, which had invaded Afghanistan in 1979—also fought to suppress Shia movements.

Relations between the Shia and the Wahhabis are inherently strained because the Wahhabis consider the rituals of the Shia to be the epitome of shirk, or polytheism. In the late 1920s, the Ikhwan (Ibn Saud's fighting force of converted Wahhabi Bedouin Muslims) were particularly hostile to the Shia and demanded that Abd al Aziz forcibly convert them. In response, Abd al Aziz sent Wahhabi missionaries to the Eastern Province, but he did not carry through with attempts at forced conversion. In recent decades the late leading Saudi cleric, Abd al-Aziz ibn Abd Allah ibn Baaz, issued fatwa denouncing Shia as apostates, and according to Shia scholar Vali Nasr "Abdul-Rahman al-Jibrin, a member of the Higher Council of Ulama, even sanctioned the killing of Shias, a call that was reiterated by Wahhabi religious literature as late as 2002."

Government policy has been to allow Shia their own mosques and to exempt Shia from Hanbali inheritance practices. Nevertheless, Shia have been forbidden all but the most modest displays on their principal festivals, which are often occasions of sectarian strife in the Persian Gulf region, with its mixed Sunni–Shia populations.

According to a report by the Human Rights Watch:

And Amnesty International adds:

As of 2006 four of the 150 members of Saudi Arabia's "handpicked" parliament were Shia, but no city had a Shia mayor or police chief, and none of the 300 girls schools for Shia in the Eastern Province had a Shia principal. According to scholar Vali Nasr, Saudi textbooks "characterize Shiism as a form of heresy ... worse than Christianity and Judaism."

Forced into exile in the 1970s, Saudi Shia leader Hassan al-Saffar is said to have been "powerfully influenced" by the works of Sunni Islamists of the Muslim Brotherhood and Jamaat-e-Islami and by their call for Islamic revolution and an Islamic state.

Following the 1979 Iranian Revolution, Shia in Hasa ignored the ban on mourning ceremonies commemorating Ashura. When police broke them up three days of rampage ensued—burned cars, attacked banks, looted shops—centered around Qatif. At least 17 Shia were killed. In February 1980 disturbances were "less spontaneous" and even bloodier. Meanwhile, broadcasts from Iran in the name of the Islamic Revolutionary Organization attacked the monarchy, telling listeners, "Kings despoil a country when they enter it and make the noblest of its people its meanest ... This is the nature of monarchy, which is rejected by Islam."

By 1993, Saudi Shia had abandoned uncompromising demands and some of al-Saffar's followers met with King Fahd with promises made for reform. In 2005 the new King Abdullah also relaxed some restrictions on the Shia. However, Shia continue to be arrested for commemorating Ashura as of 2006. In December 2006, amidst escalating tensions in Iraq, 38 high ranking Saudi clerics called on Sunni Muslims around the world to "mobilise against Shiites".

Shia Grand Ayatollah Naser Makarem Shirazi is reported to have responded:

 Saudi Sunni
A large fraction of the foreign Sunni extremists who have entered Iraq to fight against Shia and the American occupation are thought to be Saudis. According to one estimate, of the approximately 1,200 foreign fighters captured in Syria between summer 2003 and summer 2005, 85% were Saudis.

Another reflection of grassroots Wahhabi or Saudi antipathy to Shia was a statement by Saudi cleric Nasir al-Umar, who accused Iraqi Shias of close ties to the United States and argued that both were enemies of Muslims everywhere.

 Al-Qaeda
Some Wahabi groups, often labeled as takfiri and sometimes linked to Al-Qaeda, have even advocated the persecution of the Shia as heretics. Such groups have been allegedly responsible for violent attacks and suicide bombings at Shi'a gatherings at mosques and shrines, most notably in Iraq during the Ashura mourning ceremonies where hundreds of Shias were killed in coordinated suicide bombings, but also in Pakistan and Afghanistan. However, in a video message, Al-Qaeda deputy Dr Ayman al-Zawahiri directed Abu Musab al-Zarqawi, of Al-Qaeda in Iraq, not to attack civilian targets but to focus on the occupation troops. His call seems to have been ignored, or swept away in the increasing tensions of Iraq under occupation.

Lebanon 
Though sectarian tensions in Lebanon were at their height during the Lebanese Civil War, the Shia–Sunni relations were not the main conflict of the war. The Shia party/militia of Hezbollah emerged in Lebanon during the Lebanese Civil War as one of the strongest forces following the Israeli withdrawal in the year 2000, and the collapse of the South Lebanese Army in the South. The tensions blew into a limited warfare between Shia dominated and Sunni dominated political alliances in 2008.

With the eruption of the Syrian Civil War, tensions increased between the Shia-affiliated Alawites and Sunnis of Tripoli, erupting twice into deadly violence—in June 2011, and the second time in February 2012. The Syrian war has affected Hezbollah, which was once lauded by both Sunnis and Shi'ites for its battles against Israel, but now has lost support from many Sunnis for its military assistance to Syrian President Bashar al-Assad.

 The bombings are thought to be in retaliation for a large car bomb which detonated on 15 August 2013 and killed at least 24 and wounded hundreds in a part of Beirut controlled by the Hezbollah

Jordan 

Although the country of Jordan is 95% Sunni and has not seen any Shia–Sunni fighting within, it has played a part in the recent Shia-Sunni strife. It is the home country of anti-Shia insurgent Raed Mansour al-Banna, who died perpetrating one of Iraq's worst suicide bombings in the city of Al-Hillah. Al-Banna killed 125 Shia and wounded another 150 in the 2005 Al Hillah bombing of a police recruiting station and adjacent open air market. In March 2005 Salt, al-Banna's home town, saw a three-day wake for al-Banna who Jordanian newspapers and celebrants proclaimed a martyr to Islam, which by definition made the Shia victims "infidels whose murder was justified." Following the wake Shia mobs in Iraq attacked the Jordanian embassy on 20 March 2005. Ambassadors were withdrawn from both countries. All this resulted despite the strong filial bonds, ties of commerce, and traditional friendship between the two neighboring countries.

Egypt 
According to Pew, roughly 99% of Egyptian Muslims regarded themselves as Sunni Muslims. others put the number of Shias somewhere between 800,000 to about two to three million. The Syrian Civil War has brought on an increase in anti-Shia rhetoric, and what Human Rights Watch states is "anti-Shia hate speech by Salafis". In 2013 a mob of several hundred attacked a house in the village of Abu Musallim near Cairo, dragging four Shia worshipers through the street before lynching them. Eight other Shia were injured.

Yemen 

Muslims in Yemen include the majority Shafi'i (Sunni) and the minority Zaidi (Shia). Zaidi are sometimes called "Fiver Shia" instead of Twelver Shia because they recognize the first four of the Twelve Imams but accept Zayd ibn Ali as their "Fifth Imām" rather than his brother Muhammad al-Baqir. Shia–Sunni conflict in Yemen involves the Shia insurgency in northern Yemen.

Both Shia and Sunni dissidents in Yemen have similar complaints about the government—cooperation with the American government and an alleged failure to following Sharia law—but it's the Shia who have allegedly been singled out for government crackdown.

During and after the US-led invasion of Iraq, members of the Zaidi-Shia community protested after Friday prayers every week outside mosques, particularly the Grand Mosque in Sana'a, during which they shouted anti-US and anti-Israeli slogans, and criticised the government's close ties to America. These protests were led by ex-parliament member and Imam, Bader Eddine al-Houthi. In response the Yemeni government has implemented a campaign to crush to the Zaidi-Shia rebellion" and harass journalists.

These latest measures come as the government faces a Sunni rebellion with a similar motivation to the Zaidi discontent.

A March 2015 suicide bombing of two mosques (used mainly by supporters of the Zaidi Shia-led Houthi rebel movement), in the Yemeni capital of Sanaa, killed at least 137 people and wounded 300. The Sunni Islamic State of Iraq and the Levant movement claimed responsibility, issuing a statement saying: "Let the polytheist Houthis know that the soldiers of the Islamic State will not rest until we have uprooted them." Both the Sunni al-Qaeda and "Islamic State" consider Shia Muslims to be heretics.

Bahrain 

The small Persian Gulf island state of Bahrain has a Shia majority but is ruled by Sunni Al Khalifa family as a constitutional monarchy, with Sunni dominating the ruling class and military and disproportionately represented in the business and landownership. According to the CIA World Factbook, Al Wefaq the largest Shia political society, won the largest number of seats in the elected chamber of the legislature. However, Shia discontent has resurfaced in recent years with street demonstrations and occasional low-level violence." Bahrain has many disaffected unemployed youths and many have protested Sheikh Hamad bin Isa Al Khalifa's efforts to create a parliament as merely a "cooptation of the effendis", i.e. traditional elders and notables. Bahrain's 2002 election was widely boycotted by Shia. Mass demonstrations have been held in favor of full-fledged democracy in March and June 2005, against an alleged insult to Ayatollah Khamenei in July 2005.

Pakistan 

Pakistan's citizens have had serious Shia-Sunni discord. Almost 90% of Pakistan's Muslim population is Sunni, with 10% being Shia, but this Shia minority forms the second largest Shia population of any country, larger than the Shia majority in Iraq.

Until recently Shia–Sunni relations have been cordial, and a majority of people of both sects participated in the creation the state of Pakistan in the 1940s. Despite the fact that Pakistan is a Sunni majority country, Shias have been elected to top offices and played an important part in the country's politics. Several top Pakistani military and political figures such as General Muhammad Musa, and Pakistan's President Yahya Khan were Shia, as well as Former President Asif Ali Zardari; in addition, the founder of modern Pakistan, Muhammad Ali Jinnah, was a Shia. There are many intermarriages between Shia and Sunnis in Pakistan.

Unfortunately, from 1987 to 2007, "as many as 4,000 people are estimated to have died" in Shia-Sunni sectarian fighting in Pakistan", 300 being killed in 2006. Amongst the culprits blamed for the killing are Al-Qaeda working "with local sectarian groups" to kill what they perceive as Shia apostates, and "foreign powers ... trying to sow discord." Most violence takes place in the largest province of Punjab and the country's commercial and financial capital, Karachi. There have also been conflagrations in the provinces of Khyber Pakhtunkhwa, Balochistan and Azad Kashmir, with several hundreds of Shia Hazara killed in Balochistan killed since 2008.

Arab states especially Saudi Arabia and GCC states have been funding extremist Deobandi Sunnis and Wahhabis in Pakistan, since the Afghan Jihad. Whereas Iran has been funding Shia militant groups such as Sipah-e-Muhammad Pakistan, resulting in tit-for-tat attacks on each other. Pakistan has become a battleground between Saudi Arabia-funded Deobandi Sunni and Wahhabis and Iran-funded Shia resulting in the deaths of thousands of innocent Muslims.

 Background
Some see a precursor of Pakistani Shia–Sunni strife in the April 1979 execution of deposed President Zulfikar Ali Bhutto on questionable charges by Islamic fundamentalist General Muhammad Zia-ul-Haq. Ali Bhutto was Shia, Zia ul-Haq a Sunni.

Zia-ul-Haq's Islamization that followed was resisted by Shia who saw it as "Sunnification" as the laws and regulations were based on Sunni fiqh. In July 1980, 25,000 Shia protested the Islamization laws in the capital Islamabad. Further exacerbating the situation was the dislike between Shia leader Imam Khomeini and General Zia ul-Haq.

Shia formed student associations and a Shia party, Sunni began to form sectarian militias recruited from Deobandi and Ahl al-Hadith madrasahs. Preaching against the Shia in Pakistan was cleric Israr Ahmed. Manzoor Nomani, a senior Indian cleric with close ties to Saudi Arabia published a book entitled Iranian Revolution: Imam Khomeini and Shiism. The book, which "became the gospel of Deobandi militants" in the 1980s, attacked Khomeini and argued the excesses of the Islamic revolution were proof that Shiism was not the doctrine of misguided brothers, but beyond the Islamic pale.

Anti-Shia groups in Pakistan include the Lashkar-e-Jhangvi and Sipah-e-Sahaba Pakistan, offshoots of the Jamiat Ulema-e-Islam (JUI). The groups demand the expulsion of all Shias from Pakistan and have killed hundreds of Pakistani Shias between 1996 and 1999. As in Iraq they "targeted Shia in their holy places and mosques, especially during times of communal prayer." From January to May 1997, Sunni terror groups assassinated 75 Shia community leaders "in a systematic attempt to remove Shias from positions of authority." Lashkar-e-Jhangvi has declared Shia to be "American agents" and the "near enemy" in global jihad.

An example of an early Shia–Sunni fitna shootout occurred in Kurram, one of the tribal agencies of the Northwest Pakistan, where the Pushtun population was split between Sunnis and Shia. In September 1996 more than 200 people were killed when a gun battle between teenage Shia and Sunni escalated into a communal war that lasted five days. Women and children were kidnapped and gunmen even executed out-of-towners who were staying at a local hotel.

"Over 80,000 Pakistani Islamic militants have trained and fought with the Taliban since 1994. They form a hardcore of Islamic activists, ever-ready to carry out a similar Taliban-style Islamic revolution in Pakistan.", according to Pakistani journalist Ahmed Rashid.

Afghanistan 

Shia–Sunni strife in Pakistan is strongly intertwined with that in Afghanistan. The anti-Shia Afghan Taliban regime helped anti-Shia Pakistani groups and vice versa. Lashkar-e-Jhangvi and Sipah-e-Sahaba Pakistan, have sent thousands of volunteers to fight with the Taliban regime and "in return the Taliban gave sanctuary to their leaders in the Afghan capital of Kabul."

Shia–Sunni strife inside of Afghanistan has mainly been a function of the puritanical Sunni Taliban's clashes with Shia Afghans, primarily the Hazara ethnic group.

In 1998 more than 8,000 noncombatants were killed when the Taliban attacked Mazar-i-Sharif and Bamiyan where many Hazaras live. Some of the slaughter was indiscriminate, but many were Shia targeted by the Taliban. Taliban commander and governor Mullah Niazi banned prayer at Shia mosques and expressed takfir of the Shia in a declaration from Mazar's central mosque:

Assisting the Taliban in the murder of Iranian diplomatic and intelligence officials at the Iranian Consulate in Mazar were "several Pakistani militants of the anti-Shia, Sipah-e-Sahaba party."

Nigeria 

In Nigeria—the most populous country in Africa—until recently almost all Muslims were Sunni. As of 2017, estimates of the number of Nigeria's 90–95 million Muslims who are Shia vary from between 20 million (Shia estimate), to less than five million (Sunni estimate) but according to Pew research center, less than 5% of the Muslim population in Nigeria are Shia.

In the 1980s, Ibrahim El-Zakzaky—a Nigerian admirer of the Iranian Revolution who lived in Iran for some years and converted to Shia Islam—established the Islamic Movement of Nigeria. The movement has established "more than 300 schools, Islamic centers, a newspaper, guards and a `martyrs’ foundation`". Its network is similar to that of Hezbollah in Lebanon, with a focus on Iran, its Supreme Leader, and fighting America as the enemy of Islam. According to a former U.S. State Department specialist on Nigeria, Matthew Page, the Islamic Movement receives "about $10,000 a month" in Iranian funding. Many of the converted are poor Muslims.

The Shia campaign has clashed with Saudi Arabian, which also funds religious centers, school, and trains students and clerics, but as part of an effort to spread its competing Wahabbi interpretation of Islam. According to Wikileaks, "Saudi cables" released in 2015 "reveal concern" about "Iran-driven Shiite expansion from Mali, Mauritania, Burkina Faso and Nigeria" to Shia Islam has taken place in Nigeria since the Iranian Revolution.

Shia Muslims protest that they have been persecuted by the Nigerian government. In 1998 Nigerian President General Sani Abacha accused Ibrahim El-Zakzaky  of being a Shia. In December 2015 the Nigerian government alleged that the Islamic Movement attempted to kill Nigeria's army chief-of-staff. In retaliation, troops killed more than 300 Shiites in the city of Zaria. Hundreds of El-Zakzaky's followers were also arrested. As of 2019, El-Zakzaky was still imprisoned.

South East Asia 
Islam is the dominant religion in Indonesia, which also has a larger Muslim population than any other country in the world, with approximately 202.9 million identified as Muslim (88.2% of the total population) as of 2009.

The majority adheres to the Sunni Muslim tradition mainly of the Shafi'i madhhab. Around one million are Shias, who are concentrated around Jakarta. In general, the Muslim community can be categorized in terms of two orientations: "modernists," who closely adhere to orthodox theology while embracing modern learning; and "traditionalists," who tend to follow the interpretations of local religious leaders (predominantly in Java) and religious teachers at Islamic boarding schools (pesantren). In Indonesia, in 2015, Sunni clerics denounced the Shia as "heretics", and the mayor of Bogor proposed banning the Shia Ashura holy day. The Shia community has also been subject to hate campaigns and intimidation, with fears of this escalating into violence.

Malaysia claims to be a tolerant Islamic state, however since 2010 it has banned the preaching of Shia Islam, with a "particular ferocity" and warns against Shiism with its, "evil and blasphemous beliefs".

United States 
In late 2006 or early 2007, in what journalist Seymour Hersh called The Redirection, the United States changed its policy in the Muslim world, shifting its support from the Shia to the Sunni, with the goal of "containing" Iran and as a by-product bolstering Sunni extremist groups. Richard Engel, who is an NBC News Chief Foreign Correspondent, wrote an article in late 2011 alleging that the United States Government is pro-Sunni and anti-Shia. During the Iraq War, the United States feared that a Shiite-led, Iran-friendly Iraq could have major consequences for American national security. However, nothing can be done about this as Iraq's Shiite government were democratically elected. Shadi Bushra of Stanford University wrote that the United States’ support of the Sunni monarchy during the Bahraini uprising is the latest in a long history of US support to keep the Shiites in check. The United States fears that Shiite rule in the Persian Gulf will lead to anti-US and anti-Western sentiment as well as Iranian influence in the Arab majority states. One analyst told CNN that the US strategy on putting pressure on Iran by arming its Sunni neighbors is not a new strategy for the United States.

Europe 
In Europe Shia-Sunni acrimony is part of life for tens of millions of European Muslims.

Australia 
Conflict between religious groups in the Middle East have spread to the Australian Muslim community and within Australian schools.

Islamic State of Iraq and the Levant

As of March 2015, the Islamic State of Iraq and the Levant (or ISIS/ISIL, Daesh), a Salafi jihadi extremist militant group and self-proclaimed caliphate and Islamic state led by Sunni Arabs from Iraq and Syria, had control over territory occupied by ten million people in Iraq and Syria, as well as limited territorial control in some other countries. The United Nations has held ISIS responsible for human rights abuses and war crimes, and Amnesty International has reported ethnic cleansing by the group on a "historic scale", including attacks on Shia Muslims.

According to Shia rights watch, in 2014 ISIS forces killed over 1,700 Shia civilians at Camp Speicher in Tikrit Iraq, and 670 Shia prisoners at the detention facility on the outskirts of Mosul. In June 2014, the New York Times wrote that as ISIS has "seized vast territories" in western and northern Iraq, there have been "frequent accounts of fighters’ capturing groups of people and releasing the Sunnis while the Shiites are singled out for execution". The report listed questions ISIS uses to "tell whether a person is a Sunni or a Shiite"—What is your name? Where do you live? How do you pray? What kind of music do you listen to?

After the collapse of the Iraqi army and capture of the city of Mosul by ISIS in June 2014, the "most senior" Shia spiritual leader based in Iraq, the Grand Ayatollah Ali al-Sistani, who had been known as "pacifist" in his attitudes, issued a fatwa calling for jihad against ISIS and its Sunni allies, which was seen by the Shia militias as a "de facto legalization of the militias’ advance". In Qatari another Shiite preacher, Nazar al-Qatari, "put on military fatigues to rally worshipers after evening prayers," calling on them to fight against “the slayers of Imams Hasan and Hussein” (the second and third Imams of Shia history) and for Iran's supreme leader Ayatollah Ali Khamenei.

Shia militias fighting ISIS have also been accused of atrocities. Human Rights Watch has accused government-backed Shia militias of kidnapping and killing scores of Sunni civilians in 2014.

Unity efforts
In a special interview broadcast on Al Jazeera on 14 February 2007, former Iranian president and chairman of the Expediency Discernment Council of Iran, Ayatollah Akbar Hashemi Rafsanjani and highly influential Sunni scholar Yusuf al-Qaradawi, "stressed the impermissibility of the fighting between the Sunnis and the Shi’is" and the need to "be aware of the conspiracies of the forces of hegemony and Zionism which aim to weaken [Islam] and tear it apart in Iraq."

Even on this occasion there were differences, with Rafsanjani openly asking "more than once who started" the inter-Muslim killing in Iraq, and Al-Qaradawi denying claims by Rafsanjani that he knew where "those arriving to Iraq to blow Shi’i shrines up are coming from".

Saudi–Iran summit
In a milestone for the two countries' relations, on 3 March 2007 King Abdullah of Saudi Arabia and President Mahmoud Ahmadinejad held an extraordinary summit meeting. They displayed mutual warmth with hugs and smiles for cameras and
promised "a thaw in relations between the two regional powers but stopped short of agreeing on any concrete plans to tackle the escalating sectarian and political crises throughout the Middle East."

On his return to Tehran, Ahmadinejad declared that:

Saudi officials had no comment about Ahmadinejad's statements, but the Saudi official government news agency did say:

Saudi Foreign Minister Prince Saud bin Faisal bin Abdul-Aziz said:

Effort to bring unity between Sunni and Shia Muslims had been attempted by Allama Muhammad Taqi Qummi.

Scholarly opinions

Sunni
Sheikh Mahmoud Shaltut: In a Fatwa Sheikh Shaltut declared worship according to the doctrine of the Twelve Shia to be valid and recognized the Shiite as an Islamic School.
 Muhammad Sayyid Tantawy: "I think that anyone who believes that there is no god but Allah and that Muhammad is his Messenger is definitely a Muslim. Therefore, we have been supporting, for a long time, through Al-Azhar, many calls for the reconciliation of Islamic schools of thought. Muslims should work on becoming united, and protecting themselves from denominational sectarian fragmentation. There are no Shiites and no Sunni. We are all Muslims. Regretfully; the passions and prejudices that some resort to, are the reason behind the fragmentation of the Islamic nation."
 Sheikh Mohammed al-Ghazali: "It is the duty of all Muslims to unite against enemies of Islam and their propaganda".
 Sheikh Abd al-Majid Salim, in a letter that was sent to Ayatollah Borujerdi by Sheikh Abd al-Majid Salim, was written: "The first thing that becomes obligatory to scholars, Shia or Sunni, is removing dissension from the minds of Muslims."
 Vasel Nasr, the Grand Mufti of Egypt: "We ask Allah to create unity among Muslims and remove any enmity, disagreement and contention in the ancillaries of Fiqh between them."

Shiite
Ayatollah Seyyed Hossein Borujerdi sent a letter to Sheikh Abd al-Majid Salim, the Grand Mufti of Sunnis and former Chancellor of Al-Azhar University and wrote: "I ask Almighty Allah to change ignorance, separation and distribution among different Islamic Schools to each other, to the actual knowledge and kindness and solidarity."
Ayatollah Ruhollah Khomeini: "We are oneness with Sunni Muslims. We are their brothers" and "It is obligatory for all Muslims that maintain unity."
Ayatollah Seyed Ali Khamenei said in a Fatwa about creating dissension: "In addition to dissension is contrary to the Qur'an and Sunnah, this weakens Muslims. So, creating dissension is forbidden (Haram)."
Ayatollah Ali al-Sistani, in answer to the question "is anyone who says Shahadah, prays and follow one of the Islamic Schools, a Muslim?", Sistani replied: "Every one who says Shahadah, acts as you describe and does not have enmity towards Ahl al-Bayt, is muslim."

See also

 Amman Message
 Anti-Shi'ism
 Criticism of Twelver Shia Islam
 Glossary of Islam
 Index of Islam-related articles
 International Islamic Unity Conference (Iran)
 Kharijite
 Organisation of Islamic Cooperation
 Outline of Islam
 Rafida
 Shia Muslims in the Arab world
 Sunni fatwas on Shias
 The World Forum for Proximity of Islamic Schools of Thought
 Sufi–Salafi relations
 Islam in Iran

References

Further reading

 
 
 The Arab Shia: The Forgotten Muslims, by Graham E. Fuller and Rend Rahim Francke. New York: Saint Martin's Press, 1999, 
 Shi'a Islam, by Muhammad Husayn Tabatabaei and Hossein Nasr, SUNY Press, 1979. 
Saudi Clerics and Shia Islam, by Raihan Ismail, Oxford University Press, 2016. 
 Don't Fear the Shiites: The Idea of a Teheran-Controlled "Shiite Crescent" over the Greater Middle East is at Odds with Reality, by Michael Bröning. In: International Politics and Society, 3 /2008, pp. 60–75.
Here Are Some of the Day-To-Day Differences Between Sunnis and Shiites. Azadeh Moaveni. Huffington Post, 25 June 2014
Opposing the Imam: The Legacy of the Nawasib in Islamic Literature , Nebil Husayn , Cambridge Studies in Islamic Civilization, Cambridge University Press ISBN ebook ebook: 9781108966061

External links
 "The Sunni-Shia Divide", Council on Foreign Relations

 
History of Islam
Shia Islam
Sunni Islam